Zwier Albertus "Alby" Mangels (born 16 November 1948) is an Australian adventurer and documentary film-maker widely remembered for his World Safari adventure travel films (World Safari, World Safari II, and World Safari III).

Early life
Mangels was born in the Netherlands on 16 November 1948. His father Johannes (Jos) was a leather tanner. The family moved to Australia in 1955 where they settled in Adelaide, South Australia. 

After about eighteen months in Australia his parents separated. His mother Adrianna (Sjann) remarried but died when he was fifteen. He left school at fourteen.

As a teenager, he undertook a wide variety of professions including chicken farming and house construction.

Mangels set off in 1971 with friend John Fields on what was supposed to be a one-off trip. It turned into a six-year odyssey which they filmed through several continents. The resulting film, first shown in Australia in 1977, was a significant success. Mangels continued to travel through the 1980s, filming all the way. Two more World Safari films were made from this subsequent material.  

Mangels  and Fields often spent time living with local inhabitants in many locations, frequently working for room and board or just to get to know the local culture of each area.

Biographies
A companion book to the films, Alby Mangels' World Safari, was published in the 1980s. Lynn Santer authored Mangels's authorised biography Beyond World Safari in 2007. There are also reports that a feature-length Mangels biographical film is in production with multi-awarded Hollywood veteran producer Paul Mason and in 2010 he was rumoured to have been approached to appear on Dancing with the Stars.

References

External links
Official website
Biographical Site, including sightings

1948 births
Living people
Australian documentary filmmakers
Australian media personalities
Dutch emigrants to Australia